is a former Nippon Professional Baseball player. He played for the Chiba Lotte Marines in Japan's Pacific League from 2016 to 2018.

External links

NPB

Living people
1991 births
Japanese baseball players
Nippon Professional Baseball pitchers
Chiba Lotte Marines players
Asian Games medalists in baseball
Baseball players at the 2014 Asian Games
Medalists at the 2014 Asian Games
Asian Games bronze medalists for Japan